Brian Burgess may refer to:

People
 Brian Burgess (athlete) (born 1957), Scottish high jumper
 Brian K. Burgess (born 1960), American priest
 Brian L. Burgess (born 1951), American judge
 Brian Burgess, the voice actor for Phuddle in the television series Mia and Me

See also
 Bryan Burgess (born 1977), Canadian curler